Zimmeriana longirostris is a species of gynodiastylid cumacean. It is found from Western Australia to New South Wales at depths of 5-220m.

References

Cumacea
Crustaceans of Australia
Crustaceans described in 1946